Muḥammad ibn al-Faḍl al-Jarjarāʾī was a senior Abbasid official and vizier briefly in 847/8 and again in 863 until his death in 864/5.

As his nisba shows, he came from the locality of Jarjaraya, south of Baghdad. He was born in ca. 785 and began his career as secretary to the former vizier al-Fadl ibn Marwan. When Caliph al-Mutawakkil (reigned 847–861) dismissed the long-serving vizier Muhammad ibn al-Zayyat shortly after his accession, he appointed Muhammad in his place, but soon dismissed him as well due to negligence of his duties. Caliph al-Musta'in (r. 862–866) recalled him to the post in September/October 863, and he continued to occupy it until his death in 864/5.

References

Sources
 

780s births
865 deaths
9th-century Arabs
Viziers of the Abbasid Caliphate